The 2013 New York City mayoral election occurred on November 5, 2013, along with elections for Comptroller, Public Advocate, Borough President, and members of the New York City Council. The incumbent mayor of New York City, Michael Bloomberg, a Republican-turned-Independent, was term-limited and thus unable to seek re-election to a fourth term in office.

Primary elections were held on September 10, 2013. The Republican nominee was former Metropolitan Transportation Authority Chairman Joe Lhota. New York City Public Advocate Bill de Blasio was the Democratic nominee. De Blasio was elected mayor with 73.15% of the vote, becoming the first Democrat to win a mayoral election in the city since 1989. This election ended the Republicans five-election winning streak. This election had the lowest turnout in a New York mayoral election since the participation of women in 1917, with a turnout of 13.4% of registered voters.

Background
Republican and Republican-endorsed candidates had won five successive mayoral elections in New York City. Republican Rudy Giuliani was elected in 1993 and re-elected in 1997. Republican Michael Bloomberg was then elected in 2001 and re-elected in 2005. He left the Republican Party in 2007, and successfully persuaded the city council to extend the city's term limits law so that he could run for a third term. He was re-elected as an Independent on the Republican and Independence/Jobs & Education ballot lines in 2009. The term limits law was subsequently changed by a referendum in 2010, reverting the limit to two terms.

Democratic primary
As the campaign started, early polling showed city council speaker Christine Quinn as the frontrunner. However, she was hampered by running what was widely viewed as a poor campaign, and by her connections to incumbent mayor Bloomberg. As Quinn declined in the polls, former U.S. Representative Anthony Weiner became the new frontrunner, helped by his popularity with women voters. However, Weiner's campaign collapsed after it was revealed that he had continued to engage in sexting after he had resigned from congress due to a previous sexting scandal. After this development, New York City Public Advocate Bill de Blasio surged in the polls, helped by several ads featuring de Blasio's interracial family, especially his son Dante, and by a campaign focusing on inequality, with de Blasio frequently referencing the novel A Tale of Two Cities. A week prior to the election, de Blasio was considered the frontrunner, and his campaign was given a boost when Mayor Bloomberg described it as "racist," outraging Democratic voters and causing them to rally around de Blasio's campaign.

Candidates

Declared
 Sal Albanese, former New York City Councilman
 Ceceilia Berkowitz, social media journalist
 Randy Credico, comedian and former director of the William Moses Kunstler Fund for Racial Justice
 Bill de Blasio, New York City Public Advocate
 John Liu, New York City Comptroller
 Christine Quinn, speaker of the New York City Council
 Erick Salgado, Pastor of the Church of Iglesia Jovenes Cristianos
 Bill Thompson, former New York City Comptroller and nominee for Mayor in 2009
 Anthony Weiner, former U.S. Representative for

Withdrew
 Tom Allon, CEO of Manhattan Media and former New York City public school teacher (initially declared as a Democrat; then withdrew and declared as a Republican; also received the nomination of the Liberal Party, before dropping out entirely)

Declined
 Alec Baldwin, actor
 William J. Bratton, former Commissioner of the New York City Police Department
 Hillary Clinton, former United States Secretary of State and former U.S. Senator
 Rubén Díaz Jr., Bronx Borough President
 Gregory Floyd, president of the New York City Teamsters union
 Leo Hindery, businessman
 Marty Markowitz, Borough President of Brooklyn
 Eva Moskowitz, CEO of the Success Academy Charter Schools and former New York City Councilwoman
 Ed Rendell, former Governor of Pennsylvania
 Scott Stringer, borough president of Manhattan (ran for Comptroller)
 Merryl Tisch, chancellor of the New York State Board of Regents
 Christopher O. Ward, former director of the Port Authority of New York and New Jersey
 Mortimer Zuckerman, businessman

Graphical summary

Polling

Runoff

Endorsements

Results

Republican primary

Candidates

Declared
 John Catsimatidis, businessman, owner of companies including the Red Apple Group, the Gristedes supermarket chain and the United Refining Company (received the Liberal Party nomination; then withdrew after losing the Republican primary)
 Joe Lhota, former chairman of the Metropolitan Transportation Authority (also received the Conservative Party nomination)
 George T. McDonald, founder of The Doe Fund

Withdrew
 Tom Allon, CEO of Manhattan Media and former New York City public school teacher (initially declared as a Democrat; then withdrew and declared as a Republican; also received the nomination of the Liberal Party, before dropping out entirely)
 Adolfo Carrión Jr., former director of the White House Office of Urban Affairs and former Borough President of The Bronx (a Democrat-turned-Independent, Carrión tried unsuccessfully to receive a Wilson Pakula in order to run as a Republican; received the nomination of the Independence Party)
 Malcolm Smith, state senator, former lieutenant governor of New York and former Majority Leader of the New York State Senate (a Democrat, Smith would have had to change his party affiliation or receive a Wilson Pakula in order to run as a Republican. He and several others were arrested for trying to bribe Republican leaders to give him a Wilson Pakula)

Declined
 A. R. Bernard, pastor
 Dan Donovan, Staten Island District Attorney
 Rudy Giuliani, former mayor of New York City
 Martin Golden, state senator
 Kelsey Grammer, actor
 Richard Grasso, former chairman of the New York Stock Exchange
 Raymond Kelly, Commissioner of the New York City Police Department
 Richard Parsons, chairman of Citigroup
 Edward Skyler, executive at Citigroup and former deputy mayor for operations
 Diana Taylor, former New York State Banking Department superintendent and partner of Mayor Bloomberg

Graphical summary

Polling

Bribery scandal
On April 2, 2013, federal law enforcement officers arrested numerous New York City-area politicians. These included Democratic state senator Malcolm Smith and Republican city councilman Dan Halloran, who were charged with trying to bribe various Republican political leaders so as to get Smith onto the ballot as a Republican. The Mayor of Spring Valley and local Republican party leaders were also arrested.

Endorsements

Results

Major third parties
Besides the Democratic and Republican parties, the Conservative, Green, Independence and Working Families parties are qualified New York parties. These parties have automatic ballot access.

Conservative

Nominee
 Joe Lhota, former chairman of the MTA

Unsuccessful
 George McDonald, founder of The Doe Fund
 Erick Salgado, Pastor of the Church of Iglesia Jovenes Cristianos

Green

Nominee
 Anthony Gronowicz, activist, professor and nominee for Mayor in 2005

Independence

Nominee
 Adolfo Carrión Jr., former director of the White House Office of Urban Affairs and former Borough President of The Bronx

Working Families

Nominee
 Bill de Blasio, New York City Public Advocate

Unsuccessful
 John Liu, New York City Comptroller
 Christine Quinn, Speaker of the New York City Council

Minor third parties
Any candidate not among the six qualified New York parties must petition their way onto the ballot; they do not face primary elections.

Affordable Tomorrow

Nominee
 Joseph Melaragno

Common Sense

Nominee
 Jack Hidary

Freedom

Nominee
 Michael K. Greys

Flourish Every Person

Nominee
 Michael J. Dilger

Jobs & Education

Nominee
 Jack Hidary

Liberal
After the party twice endorsed a candidate for mayor, only to see them withdraw from the race, the party declined to endorse a third candidate, although they did consider endorsing Jack Hidary.

Unsuccessful
 Jack Hidary

Withdrew
 Tom Allon, CEO of Manhattan Media and former New York City public school teacher (had initially declared as a Democrat; then withdrew and declared as a Republican, also receiving the nomination of the Liberal Party, before dropping out entirely)
 John Catsimatidis, businessman, owner of companies including the Red Apple Group, the Gristedes supermarket chain and the United Refining Company (received the nomination after Allon withdrew, dropped out entirely after he lost the Republican primary to Joe Lhota)
 Adolfo Carrión Jr., former director of the White House Office of Urban Affairs and former Borough President of The Bronx
 Joe Lhota, former chairman of the MTA

Libertarian
Joe Lhota was originally nominated as the Libertarian candidate during the Party Convention held on April 6, 2013, a nomination he declined. It was soon after ruled by the Libertarian Executive Committee that this nomination was invalid and void due to the attending voters of this first Convention not being properly credentialed. A second nominating convention was held on June 11, 2013, which nominated Michael Sanchez.

Nominee
 Michael Sanchez, activist

Unsuccessful
 Randy Credico, comedian and former director of the William Moses Kunstler Fund for Racial Justice

Withdrew
 Kristin M. Davis, former madam and Anti-Prohibition Party nominee for Governor of New York in 2010 (running for Comptroller)
 Joe Lhota, former chairman of the MTA

Reform Party of New York City

Nominee
 Carl Person, attorney and Libertarian nominee for New York Attorney General in 2010

Rent Is Too Damn High

Nominee
 Jimmy McMillan, party founder and perennial candidate

School Choice

Nominee
 Erick Salgado

Socialist Workers

Nominee
 Dan Fein, nominee for governor in 2010, Mayor in 2009 and for Comptroller in 2005

Students First

Nominee
 Joe Lhota

Tax Wall Street

Nominee
 Randy Credico

Taxes 2 High

Nominee
 Joe Lhota

War Veterans

Nominee
 Sam Sloan, chess player, publisher and Libertarian candidate for governor in 2010

Independent

Candidates

Unsuccessful
 Michael Post, sewage treatment worker

Declined
 Tony Danza, actor
 Raymond Kelly, Commissioner of the New York City Police Department

General election

Graphical summary

Polling

With Kelly

With Lhota

Three-way race

Four-way race

Open primary

Results

Results by borough

See also

New York City mayoral elections
2009 New York City mayoral election
2013 New York City Comptroller election

References

External links
 NYC.gov official website of New York City
 NY Times Election Results by neighborhood and precinct
2013 New York City Mayor  at Huffpost Pollster
 Bill de Blasio for NYC Mayor
 Joe Lhota for NYC Mayor
 Adolfo Carrión Jr. for NYC Mayor
 Anthony Gronowicz for NYC Mayor
 George McDonald for NYC Mayor
 Carl Person for NYC Mayor
 Michael Sanchez for NYC Mayor
 Jimmy McMillan for NYC Mayor
 Jack Hidary for NYC Mayor
 Randy Credico for NYC Mayor

2013
New York City mayoral
New York City mayoral
New York City
Bill de Blasio